Gerthe is a part of the city of Bochum in the Ruhr area in Germany. Up to  the 19th century  Westphalian was spoken here. Gerthe is a district in the working-class north of Bochum, in the northeast, bordering Herne and Castrop-Rauxel. The tramline to Hattingen starts here.

Boroughs of Bochum